Phoenix is the first album by the singer-songwriter Vince Bell and was released on July 16, 1994, almost twelve years after Bell was severely injured by a drunk driver. The album landed high on many critics' best-of-the-year lists for 1994.

Track listing
"Frankenstein"
"The Beast"
"Hard Road"
"Troubletown"
"Sun & Moon & Stars"
"Mirror, Mirror"
"I've Had Enough"
"Girl Who Never Saw a Mountain"
"Woman of the Phoenix"
"Just Because"
"No Tomorrow"

Personnel
Vince Bell – vocal, guitar
Geoff Muldaur – mandolin, banjo, guitars
Fritz Richmond – washtub bass
Bill Rich – bass
David Mansfield – violin
Mickey Raphael – harmonica
Stephen Bruton – guitars, mandolin
John Cale – piano
Jim Justice – violin
Paul Logan – bass
Victoria Williams – guest vocalist
Lyle Lovett – guest vocalist

Production
Producer: Bob Neuwirth

External links 
 Vince Bell official site
  Vince Bell's MySpace page
 Daryn Kagan profiles Vince Bell
 Vince Bell's artist bio at the H.A.A.M. (Houston Association of Acoustic Musicians) website
 “Introducing the Vince Bell "Handmade Hardtop Acoustic Dreadnaught Line”: lutier Vince Pawless describes custom-making a guitar for Vince Bell

1994 albums
Vince Bell albums
Albums produced by Bob Neuwirth